Villa Sola de Vega is a town and municipality in Oaxaca in south-western Mexico, part of the Sola de Vega District in the Sierra Sur Region. 
Significado 
"Lugar de codornices" proviene de "zollin": codorniz y de "tlán": lugar de.

The Sola River runs through the municipality, a tributary of the Atoyac River.
The terrain is rugged and forested with oak and pines in the highlands and shrubs in the lowlands.
Fauna include deer, wild boar, fox, grasshoppers, rabbits, coyotes, reptiles and armadillos. 

As of 2005, the municipality had 2,448 households with a total population of 11,884, of whom 199 spoke an indigenous language. Lachixío Zapotec is spoken in the municipality. Elotepec Zapotec is spoken in the village of San Juan Elotepec.

Most of the population is engaged in agriculture, growing corn and beans, while a minority is dedicated to logging.
Sola de Vega is connected by a paved road to Puerto Escondido, Oaxaca, but other roads are unpaved.

References

External links 

Municipalities of Oaxaca